Beaver Lake Nature Center is a  natural area located  west of Baldwinsville, New York.  The Nature Center is an Onondaga County Parks facility and is meant to expose visitors to a variety of outdoor experiences.

The nature center is open year-round (except Thanksgiving and Christmas) from 7:30 a.m. to near dusk.  There is a $5 per vehicle admission fee for visiting (2018).

 of trails allow people to explore the diverse habitats which can be found at the center. It also serves as an environmental educational facility with as many as 12,000 school children visiting each year. The year-round operation of the facility makes the outdoor experience available to a wide range of people.

In summer months canoes and kayaks are available to rent. In spring and fall the lake serves as a migratory stop for thousands of ducks and Canada geese. The park is also opened in the winter with the trails used for cross-country skiing and snowshoeing.

The Nature Center serves to enhance the appreciation, awareness, and understanding of the natural world for visitors of all ages.

Beaver lake is supported by the not-for-profit Friends of Beaver Lake, Inc. This membership-based organization provides financial and volunteer support to the community Nature Center.

External links

Nature centers in New York (state)
Nature reserves in New York (state)
Parks in Onondaga County, New York